School District No. 43 (Coquitlam)  or SD43 is one of the sixty school districts in British Columbia. The district is the third-largest in British Columbia with 45 elementary schools, 14 middle schools, and 11 secondary schools. School District No. 43 (Coquitlam) serves the Tri-Cities, including the cities of Coquitlam, Port Coquitlam, Port Moody, and the villages of Anmore and Belcarra. The school district covers an area of 120 square kilometres and serves a total combined population of 210,390 residents. It has over 4,000 full-time and part-time employees. It has one of the highest graduation rates in the province, with 91.9% of students graduating in the 2013/14 school year.

Administration
As of March 2022, the current superintendent of SD43 is Patricia Gartland. The five municipalities served by SD43 are represented by elected trustees that serve on the Board of Education. There are currently 9 elected trustees in SD43. The chair of the board is Michael Thomas, and the vice-chair is Carol Cahoon.

District Programs
 Diverse Student Services
 Core French
 Early French Immersion (starting in Kindergarten, or Grade 1)
 Late French Immersion (starting in Grade 6)
 Montessori Alternate Program
 EAL/Multiculturalism
 International Education
 MACC (Middle Age Cluster Class|Grades 6 - 8)
 Continuing Education
 Community Schools
 Settlement Workers In School
 District wide gifted programming
 Summer Learning
 Aboriginal Education
 International Baccalaureate
 Reggio-influenced Program
 Variety of Career and Trades

By 2020 it worked with the Confucius Institute with making Chinese cultural and Mandarin language programs in its schools. In 2020 the Globe and Mail stated that the organization "has taken a more expansive role, providing resources for core courses".

French Immersion
The first French Immersion program in SD43 was implemented in 1968 at Alderson Elementary. In 1978, the district implemented a late French Immersion program. Currently there are 5,900 students enrolled in the program. This comprises 10.3% of the total district student population.

Coquitlam Open Learning
SD43 offers online, Learning Centre, and FastTrack courses to eligible British Columbia students through Coquitlam Open Learning (COL). Learning Centre courses are online or paper-based and allow the student to drop in at the Coquitlam Learning Opportunity Centre (CLOC), while FastTrack courses have some regularly schedule classes, with the rest of the course instruction occurring online.

COL also operates Inquiry Hub Secondary School, which is an alternate secondary school focused on a flexible and inquiry-based education. Students learn through online study, group project work, personal inquiry time, and seminars. It opened September 2012 at the former site of Millside Elementary. The school meets Ministry of Education requirements while still allowing students to meet learning outcomes with a more flexible approach. Most recently, the school received the 2014-15 Ken Spencer Award for Innovation in Teaching and Learning.

Elementary schools

Middle schools

Secondary schools

See also
 List of school districts in British Columbia

References

External links
School District 43

Education in Coquitlam
Port Coquitlam
Port Moody
Belcarra
43